Watch the Sky is an album by singer-songwriter Patty Larkin. It was released by Vanguard Records on January 22, 2008.

Track listing
 "Phone Message"
 "Cover Me"
 "Hallelujah"
 "Beautiful"
 "Dear Heart"
 "Hollywood"
 "Walking In My Sleep"
 "All Souls Day"
 "Bound Brook"
 "Traveling Alone"
 "Here"
 "Waterside"

All songs were written by Patty Larkin.

Album personnel
 Patty Larkin - vocals, acoustic guitar, electric guitar, lap steel guitar, National guitar, baritone guitar, bass guitar, chimes, drum loops, backing vocals

Reviews
Jon Pareles, New York Times CD review, January 21, 2008
Joan Anderman. Boston Globe online review, January 22, 2008

References

Patty Larkin albums
2008 albums
Vanguard Records albums